Edith Hancke (14 October 1928 – 4 June 2015) was a German stage, film and television actress.

Life and career 
Edith Hancke, daughter of a bank clerk, grew up in Berlin-Charlottenburg. She received an education at the Lettehaus and, at the age of 20, attended Marlise Ludwig's acting school at Wilmersdorfer Wilhelmsaue. She received her first engagements at Berlin theaters beginning in 1948. She made guest appearances at the Renaissance Theater, the Deutsches Theater, the Schlosspark Theater, the Schillertheater, the Theater am Kurfürstendamm and the Berliner Komödie, among others. 

Her real profession remained the theater. Several times she received the Golden Curtain, the award for the most popular actress in Berlin. Edith Hancke also performed for two years as a member of the cabaret Die Stachelschweine. She appeared in 150 episodes of the popular radio entertainment series Pension Spreewitz on RIAS. Even at the age of 72, she starred in the play Fenster zum Flur for one year. From 1981 to 1987, she was the narrator in the RIAS radio play series Damals war's - Geschichten aus dem alten Berlin. She thus succeeded the narrator Ewald Wenck, who died in 1981.

Through her work as a dubbing artist, Hancke's voice (which was the result of a botched tonsillectomy as a child)[4] can be heard in many foreign films, such as the Czechoslovakian musical feature film Limonaden-Joe (1964). From 1991 to 1994, Hancke dubbed Baby Sinclair in the U.S. series The Dinos, which became famous for the recurring exclamation "Not the mommy!".  She had been married since 1972 to fellow actor Klaus Sonnenschein, whom she had met at the Theater Tribüne in 1970, in their third marriage and lived with him in their home in Holstein and in Berlin-Schlachtensee. In the TV film Schaumküsse (2009), Hancke and Sonnenschein made a joint appearance as a married couple, which was their last role as actors for both of them.

Selected filmography

 The Beaver Coat (1949) - Adelheid Wolff
 Bürgermeister Anna (1950) - Grete Drews
 The Merry Wives of Windsor (1950) - Lehrling bei Reich (uncredited)
 Modell Bianka (1951) - Jungarbeiterin Inge Lang
 We'll Talk About Love Later (1953) - Frau Pingel
 The Abduction of the Sabine Women (1954) - Fräulein Müller-Muthesius
 Sky Without Stars (1955) - Frau am Kontrollpunkt
 Your Life Guards (1955) - Zofe
 Urlaub auf Ehrenwort (1955) - Erna
 A Thousand Melodies (1956)
 The Captain from Köpenick (1956) - Sick girl
 If We All Were Angels (1956) - Junge Animierdame
 Ein Mann muß nicht immer schön sein (1956) - Frl. Zimmermann, Sekretärin 
 Spring in Berlin (1957) - Uschi Paulsen
 Madeleine Tel. 13 62 11 (1958) - Edith - The Maid
 Schmutziger Engel (1958) - Gerti
 Schwarzwälder Kirsch (1958) - Jette Palm
 The Muzzle (1958) - Billa
 Ohne Mutter geht es nicht (1958) - Hausmädchen Elisabeth
 My Ninety Nine Brides (1958) - Ruth
 Kleine Leute mal ganz groß (1958) - Marie Maier
 Court Martial (1959) - Frl. Wehner
 Peter Shoots Down the Bird (1959) - Fräulein Lehmann
 Of Course, the Motorists (1959) - Autofahrerin
 Arzt aus Leidenschaft (1959) - Schwester Elvira
 Bumerang (1960) - Woman in train
 Als geheilt entlassen (1960) - Lore
 I Learned That in Paris (1960)
 Vertauschtes Leben (1961)
 Bei Pichler stimmt die Kasse nicht (1961) - Emma
 The Marriage of Mr. Mississippi (1961) - Lukretia
 Am Sonntag will mein Süsser mit mir segeln gehn (1961) - Minna, die Köchin
 The Strange Countess (1961) - Lizzy Smith
 Beloved Impostor (1961) - Stewardess
 So liebt und küsst man in Tirol (1961) - Ida Würzig
 Dicke Luft (1962) - Fräulein Weierlein
 Ohne Krimi geht die Mimi nie ins Bett (1962) - Mimi
 Universo di notte (1962) - Self - Host German Version
 Breakfast in Bed (1963) - Mrs. Müller
 Holiday in St. Tropez (1964) - Friedericke Kussmaul
 Don't Tell Me Any Stories (1964) - 'Veilchen' (NSU Prinz) (voice)
 Black Eagle of Santa Fe (1965) - Alice
 Tausend Takte Übermut (1965) - Ernestine Glücklich
 Das große Glück (1967) - Mrs. Kleinschmitt
 Mittsommernacht (1967) - Miss Nilsson
 Paradies der flotten Sünder (1968) - Grete
 Otto ist auf Frauen scharf (1968) - Garderobenfrau
 Charley's Uncle (1969) - Helga
 Heintje: A Heart Goes on a Journey (1969) - Lieschen
 Why Did I Ever Say Yes Twice? (1969) - Hausmädchen
 Our Willi Is the Best (1971) - Elsetraut Knöpfke
 Old Barge, Young Love (1973) - Eleonore Strunz
 Unsere Tante ist das Letzte (1973) - Sieglinde Hirsekorn, Otto-Wilhelms Frau
 Meister Eder und sein Pumuckl (1982) - Frau Bauer

References

Bibliography
 Cowie, Peter. World Filmography: 1967. Fairleigh Dickinson Univ Press, 1977.

External links

1928 births
2015 deaths
German film actresses
German stage actresses
German television actresses
20th-century German actresses
21st-century German actresses
Actresses from Berlin
Rundfunk im amerikanischen Sektor people
Burials at the Waldfriedhof Zehlendorf